is a Japanese actress and model who is affiliated with LesPros Entertainment.

Filmography

TV series

Films

References

External links
Official profile at LesPros Entertainment 
  

Japanese television actresses
Japanese female models
1983 births
Living people
People from Higashimurayama, Tokyo
Actresses from Tokyo
20th-century Japanese actresses
21st-century Japanese actresses
Models from Tokyo Metropolis